Elsa Gaubert (born 21 March 2000) is a French female canoeist who won three medals at senior level at the Wildwater Canoeing World Championships.

Medals at the World Championships
Senior

References

External links
 

2000 births
Living people
French female canoeists
Place of birth missing (living people)